Chapin Peak is a prominent rock peak,  high, on the west side of Reedy Glacier, standing  southeast of Stich Peak in the Quartz Hills. It was mapped by the United States Geological Survey (USGS) surveys and from U.S. Navy air photos, 1960–64, and named by the Advisory Committee on Antarctic Names for Captain Howard Chapin, United States Marine Corps, pilot with U.S. Navy Squadron VX-6 at McMurdo Station, 1962–63 season.

References 

Mountains of Marie Byrd Land